is a Japanese sprinter. He competed in the men's 4 × 100 metres relay at the 1964 Summer Olympics.

References

External links
 

1940 births
Living people
Athletes (track and field) at the 1964 Summer Olympics
Japanese male sprinters
Olympic athletes of Japan
Place of birth missing (living people)
Asian Games medalists in athletics (track and field)
Asian Games silver medalists for Japan
Athletes (track and field) at the 1962 Asian Games
Medalists at the 1962 Asian Games
Universiade medalists in athletics (track and field)
Universiade silver medalists for Japan
20th-century Japanese people
21st-century Japanese people